John T. Dekker (born 1929) is a retired Christian missionary.

Dekker was born and raised in Holland before moving to Canada to study at Prairie Bible College. He later studied at the Summer Institute of Linguistics, Grace Theological Seminary, and Reformed Theological Seminary.

He and his wife Helen served as missionaries with Regions Beyond Missionary Union. They engaged in medical, linguistic, and church work among the Dani people of Western New Guinea from 1960 to 1981. As a result of their ministry, the Christian population among the Dani grew from 0 to 13,000.

In 1985, Dekker wrote Torches of Joy which tells the story of his life and ministry to the Dani. After his retirement, Dekker lived in Montrose, Colorado.

He is father of the Christian novelist Ted Dekker.

References

1929 births
Living people
Dutch emigrants to Canada
Protestant missionaries in Indonesia
Grace Theological Seminary alumni
Reformed Theological Seminary alumni